Valluvar is a sub-caste belonging to the Paraiyar community in the Indian state of Tamil Nadu. They are the hereditary priests of the Pallars and Paraiyars of Tamil Nadu.

Origin 

Valluvars are believed to have been the priests of the Pallava kings before the introduction of Brahmins and for sometime after their arrival. The exalted position of Valluvars in the social hierarchy during those times is indicated by inscriptions which refer to Valluvars in a respectful manner. Moreover, the Tamil saint Thiruvalluvar is believed to have been a member of this community and there is a subsect of Valluvars claiming descent from him.

An independent community 

Though Valluvars were regarded as a subgroup of the Paraiyar community by caste Hindus, Thurston mentions that Valluvars did not eat with Paraiyars. Valluvar houses were generally located at a significant distance away from the parcheri where they lived. Owing to their occupation as priests, all males over twelve wore the sacred thread. The Valluvars were also noted for their abstinence from beef. 

The Valluvars are also called Pandaram or Valluva Pandaram.. The priests of the Valluvars are sometimes called Vellala Pandaram, Thiruvalluva Nayanar.

Valluvars were an untouchable caste.

Sub-sects 

The important sub-sects of Valluvans are Paraiyan, Tavidadari and Tiruvalluvan. Valluvars are broadly classified into two main sub-divisions: Arupadhu Katchi or sixty clans and Narpadhu Katchi or forty clans 

The  Arupadhu Katchi considered themselves the descendants of Nandi Gurukkal and have his name as their gotra. The Narpadhu Katchi are of the gotra Sidambara Sayichya Ayyamgar. The sub-division alvar claim descent from Tiruppan Alvar.

Practices 

Valluvars follow both Saivism and Vaishnavism. Saivite and Vaishnavite Valluvars dine together, but not intermarry. A particular class of Valluvars officiated as priest at Paraiyar funerals.This particular class of Valluvars was known as Paraiya Tadas and were regarded as inferior by other sections of Valluvars. Another section of Valluvars wear a necklace of tulsi beads and are known as Alvar Dasari or Tavadadhari. Some hold that the true Valluvan is one who practices astrology and that those who officiate as priests aren't true Valluvars. The affairs of the community are handled by a caste-council.The community is headed by a Kolkaran or a Kanakkan. There are the hereditary astrologers of the Indian temple town of Vaithiswaran Koil and are considered experts in Nadi astrology.

The Valluvars generally officiate in Paraiyar marriages and funerals. During such occasions, Valluvar priests used to chant Sanskrit shlokas.

Prominent individuals 
 Thiruvalluvar

Notes

References
 

Social groups of Kerala
Social groups of Tamil Nadu
Tamil society